This is a list of flags of municipalities of the Netherlands. The flags are listed per province.

Drenthe

Flevoland

Friesland

Gelderland

Groningen

Limburg

North Brabant

North Holland

Overijssel

South Holland

Utrecht

Zeeland

Caribbean Netherlands

Former municipalities

See also 
 List of Dutch flags
 List of city flags in the Netherlands

References

Municipalities
.Flags
Netherlands
Flags
Netherlands